The Embassy of Turkey in London is the diplomatic mission of Turkey in the United Kingdom. There was an embassy of the Ottoman Empire in London dating from 1793; this was suspended in 1914 following the outbreak of the First World War and replaced by the embassy of the new Republic of Turkey in 1924. From 1901-1954 the embassy was located at 69 Portland Place before moving to its current location; however this building was kept and is currently used as the Ambassador's Residence.

The embassy is housed in one of a group of Grade I listed buildings at 38—48 Belgrave Square.

Turkey also maintains a Consulate at Rutland Lodge, Rutland Gardens, Knightsbridge.

Gallery

References

External links
Official site

Turkey
Diplomatic missions of Turkey
Turkey–United Kingdom relations
Grade I listed buildings in the City of Westminster
Belgravia